This list presents the members of the Madrid Municipal Council in the 2007–2011 period, including substitutes:

References